Shakthiveda Bhaishajya Mahayagam is a global Yaga organized by Shakthiveda Wellness Mission, a Registered Charitable Trust. The 4th Bhaishajya Mahayagam was scheduled to be conducted in Bommandahalli, Bangalore from 20 to 23 February 2014. The Mahayagam is a chain of 81 episodes, performed non-stop for 81 hours covering 3 nights and 4 days. The 4th Shakthiveda Bhaishajya Mahayagam will be inaugurated by Ramalinga Reddy, Karnataka Minister for Transport, on 19 February 2014 evening at 6 P.M.  Parama Pujaniya Rishidev Sri Narendranji will be the Mukhya Yajnacharyan of 4th Bhaishajya Mahayagam.  He will be lighting up the yagam on 20 Feb 2014 at 6 am.

Bhaishajya Mahayagam

The word ‘Bhaishajya’ pertains to medicines and Maha Yagam denotes a great ritual. Unlike other Yagas, in Bhaishajya Maha Yagam, we use very rare and powerful medicinal herbs for oblation, which is the outstanding peculiarity of this event. The intention of the Yaga is to cleanse mother nature, the individuals and all beings on earth. There exists a big science behind it which is part of the ancient heritage of India and the great vision of the Seers of India. ‘Ayurveda’ the Indian Medical Branch, is their contribution in which they used medicinal herbs abundantly to cure diseases. The word ‘Ayu’ refers to life-span and ‘Veda’ is knowledge. Therefore, ‘Ayurveda’ means knowledge about your life-span.

The ancient Seers were using the same technology in Bhaishajya Maha Yagam. If herbs can cure man, it can cure nature too. Therefore, using medicinal herbs in Yaga, they were treating mother nature to cure her diseases of contaminations. Contaminations are the diseases of nature. Man polluted nature through erratic and unscrupulous living. Man is the only being which pollutes nature. No other being on earth is capable of doing so except man. Medicines are used against illness and therefore, here we are using medicinal herbs to cure the illness of existence. That is the basic science of Bhaishajya Maha Yaagam. Another question could be as to why have we adopted oblation into the fire? There is a reason. For example, if you give red chilly to one person, only he is affected by eating it. If you put that one red chilly into the fire, suddenly within split seconds the entire mob could be affected. This is because fire absorbs the essence of the chilly and immediately pass it on to the air, which spreads it in the entire locality within no time. Anything penetrates into atmosphere through air, it can easily get into eternity. The effect may get subtler, but then it moves faster and faster. When medicinal herbs are put into huge fire, its tremendous effect will surely reach the entire globe.

Therefore, Bhaishajya MahaYaga is a global Yaga. It is not just a local affair. The atmosphere gets cleansed first. As a result, all the beings under the sun will also be cleansed automatically. It will positively affect the physiology, psychology, biology and spiritual wellness of man. The magnanimity of the Bhaishajya Maha Yagam is thus immeasurable.

When nature and man together enjoy wellness, not only psycho-physical-spiritual levels, but also at social, planetary, material, educational, cultural, global and governance levels also, you will find improvements. For that a series of Bhaishajya Maha Yagams to be conducted all over the world like a chain. Then slowly nature will catch up the impact of it. We are now conducting the 4th Yaga in this series.

Bhaishajya Maha Yagam organized by Shakthiveda Wellness Mission, a Registered Charitable Trust, is beyond religion. The doors are open to all religions. This is a glorious step from our side to bring in religious harmony among people. The platform is set here for total unity and love which is the desperate need of the day.

The Yaga is performed continuously for 81 hours, over the span of 3 nights and 4 days. The thrust of the Yaga is on 81 focal issues of social, national and international importance. Each hour is devoted to a particular issue and simultaneous to the incessant oblations on the one hand, the Yajnacharyan will go on cleansing relevant negative aspects through his intense Power of Intention which is transcendental in nature. Actually through this Yaga, Shakthiveda Wellness Mission is fulfilling a great social service too.

The specialty of the Yaga Kunda (fire pit) is that it is exceptionally large. The dimensions are 27 feet length and 18 feet width in an elliptical shape. The Yaga Kunda represents mother earth, which is the sankalpa.

The Yaga fire was originally lit by the Yajnacharyan on the 10th day of May 2012 at 06.00 a.m. during the 1st Yaga at Kochi, Kerala. The Divine Flame was preserved and carried over after every Yaga to the next one. The Divine Flame Vaishwanara Energy" increasingly gains more empowerment after each Yaga. This particular feature of Shakthiveda Bhaishajya Maha Yaga is found only in this context. A separate Agni Stambha will come up at Sarveswara Dhama at Bommandahalli, Bangalore exclusively to maintain and worship the Eternal Fire for the generations to come.

Mahayaga is an opportunity for the common man to witness a rare and once in a lifetime mega ceremony. Devotees can alleviate their spiritual Doshas through simple rituals. Scientists and environmentalists are allowed to conduct research on energy radiation, ecology or any other subject of their individual interest.

Bhaishajya Mahayagam Focal Issues
81 focal issues of Bhaishajya Mahayagam are given below

Shakthiveda Wellness Mission
Shakthiveda Wellness Mission is a spiritual mission founded and guided by Parama Poojya Rishidev Sri Narendranji to propagate true spiritual knowledge to entire world with a vision to create a perfect world of peace and goodness. Shakthiveda Wellness Mission is very scientific in its research methodologies and claims to have invented various techniques and methods which will assist the true seekers to speed up their spiritual progress. To help the true seekers of the ultimate reality, Rishidevji developed unique methods like Soul Reformation Programme / Jiva Yoga, to cleanse and empower the human body to connect with higher [cosmic] energies which is very essential to realize the self.

Photo gallery

References

External links

Yajna